The M1151 Enhanced Armament Carrier is an improved version of the standard Humvee (HMMWV) designed to replace the M1025A2 used by the United States Armed Forces as a response to United States Central Command requirements.

The M1151 HMMWV has a heavier chassis and improved engine to handle add-on armor. It is built on an Expanded Capacity Vehicle chassis, which allows for more passengers or additional supplies (up to 2,300 lbs).

Its two- or four-seat variant is the M1152 Enhanced Troop/Cargo/Shelter Carrier, designed to replace the M1097A2 Heavy HMMWV and M1113 Expanded Capacity Vehicle.

AM General of South Bend, Ind., was awarded a $59,963,442 contract for 814 M1152s and 31 M1151s and a $19,617,847 contract to buy and install armor kits for the M1151.

Variants
 M1151: Base model.
 M1151A1: M1151 with Integrated Armor Package installed at factory. Comes with "A-kit" by default; can add "B-kit" for increased protection. Also previously referred to as M1151P1.

See also
 List of U.S. military vehicles by model number

References

External links
 
 

All-wheel-drive vehicles
Post–Cold War armored fighting vehicles of the United States
Military vehicles of the United States
Military trucks of the United States
Off-road vehicles
Pickup trucks
United States Marine Corps equipment